William Johnston is a paralympic athlete from Ireland competing mainly in category C1 events.

William has competed in three consecutive Paralympic Games. In 1984, he won a gold and silver medal. In 1988, he failed to win a medal. In 1992, he won a bronze medal as part of Ireland's mixed boccia team.

References

Paralympic athletes of Ireland
Paralympic boccia players of Ireland
Athletes (track and field) at the 1984 Summer Paralympics
Athletes (track and field) at the 1988 Summer Paralympics
Boccia players at the 1988 Summer Paralympics
Boccia players at the 1992 Summer Paralympics
Paralympic gold medalists for Ireland
Paralympic silver medalists for Ireland
Paralympic bronze medalists for Ireland
1964 births
Living people
Medalists at the 1984 Summer Paralympics
Medalists at the 1992 Summer Paralympics
Paralympic medalists in athletics (track and field)